Survivor: Philippines is the twenty-fifth season of the American CBS competitive reality television series Survivor. The season was filmed March 18–April 25, 2012 and premiered on September 19, 2012 with a special 90-minute episode. It is the first season since Survivor: All-Stars to begin with three tribes and the seventh season overall to feature returning castaways. 

Participants' applications were due on October 4, 2011, with approximately 800 chosen for interviews in various states. From there, 15 new contestants were selected. With filming beginning in March, it marked the earliest Survivor season filming to date since Survivor: Borneo. The season featured the 15 new castaways competing with three returning castaways who were removed from their previous seasons due to illness or injury: Michael Skupin (passed out into a fire and suffered severe burns to his face and hands) of The Australian Outback, Jonathan Penner (removed due to a serious infection to his knee) originally from Cook Islands and later evacuated in Micronesia, and Russell Swan (removed after blacking out twice due to low blood pressure resulting from dehydration) of Samoa.

Denise Stapley was named the winner in the final episode on December 16, 2012, defeating Lisa Whelchel and Michael Skupin in a 6–1–1 vote, marking the second time in Survivor history (after China exactly 10 seasons earlier) where all three finalists received at least one vote. Stapley is the oldest female winner in the show's history, and the only person to have attended and survived every Tribal Council in a single season. Whelchel won $100,000 as the "Sprint Player of the Season", narrowly beating out Malcolm Freberg by 0.7% of a voting margin; the closest margin in the history of the award.

Contestants

The contestants include 15 new players to the game and three returning players, who were previously removed from their earlier seasons due to injuries, initially split into three tribes based on animals: Tandang, Kalabaw and Matsing, meaning "Rooster", "Carabao" and "Monkey" in Tagalog respectively. The merged tribe Dangrayne is a take on "it's a damn rain!", which was first suggested by returning contestant Jonathan Penner.

Notable new contestants this season include The Facts of Life star Lisa Whelchel; former Major League Baseball player Jeff Kent; Miss Delaware USA 2011 and Miss USA 2011 competitor Katie Hanson; and Miss Utah Teen USA 2010 and Miss Teen USA 2010 3rd runner-up Angelia "Angie" Layton. Abi-Maria Gomes was originally recruited for Survivor: Tocantins because of her Brazilian heritage, however she was cut.

{| class="wikitable sortable" style="margin:auto; text-align:center"
|+List of Survivor: Philippines contestants
! rowspan="2" scope="col" |Contestant
! rowspan="2" scope="col" |Age
! rowspan="2" scope="col" class=unsortable|From
! colspan="3" scope="colgroup" | Tribe
! colspan="2" scope="colgroup" | Finish
|-
! scope="col" | Original
! scope="col" | Switched
! scope="col" class=unsortable| Merged
! scope="col" class=unsortable| Placement
! scope="col" class=unsortable| Day
|-
! scope="row" style=text-align:left|
| 28
| Danville,Virginia
| rowspan="4" 
| style="background:darkgrey;" rowspan="4"|
| style="background:darkgrey;" rowspan="7"|
| 1st voted out
| Day 3
|-
! scope="row" style=text-align:left|
| 28
| Brooklyn,New York
| 2nd voted out
| Day 6
|-
! scope="row" style=text-align:left|
| 20
| Provo,Utah
| 3rd voted out
| Day 8
|-
! scope="row" style="text-align:left;font-weight:normal" | Samoa
| 45
| Glenside,Pennsylvania
| 4th voted out
| Day 10
|-
! scope="row" style=text-align:left|
| 32
| North Carolina
| rowspan="3" 
| rowspan="3" 
| Quit (Illness)
| Day 12
|-
! scope="row" style=text-align:left|
| 28
| Silver Spring,Maryland
| 5th voted out
| Day 13
|-
! scope="row" style=text-align:left|
| 22
| Newark,Delaware
| 6th voted out
| Day 16
|-
! scope="row" style=text-align:left|
| 27
| New York City,New York
| 
| 
| rowspan=11 
| 7th voted out1st jury member
| Day 19
|-
! scope="row" style=text-align:left|
| 44
| Austin,Texas
| 
| 
| 8th voted out
| Day 22
|-
! scope="row" style=text-align:left|
| 53
| Terrytown,Louisiana
| rowspan="2" 
| rowspan="2" 
| 9th voted out3rd jury member
| Day 25
|-
! scope="row" style=text-align:left|
| 24
| Holmdel,New Jersey
| 10th voted out4th jury member
| Day 27
|-
! scope="row" style="text-align:left;font-weight:normal" | Cook Islands & Micronesia
| 50
| Los Angeles,California
| rowspan="2" 
| rowspan="2" 
| 11th voted out5th jury member
| Day 30
|-
! scope="row" style=text-align:left|
| 23
| Shawnee,Kansas
| 12th voted out6th jury member
| Day 33
|-
! scope="row" style=text-align:left|
| 32
| Los Angeles,California
| 
| rowspan="4" 
| 13th voted out7th jury member
| Day 36
|-
! scope="row" style=text-align:left|
| 25
| Hermosa Beach,California
| 
| 14th voted out8th jury member
| 
|-

! scope="row" style=text-align:left|| 49
| Dallas,Texas
| rowspan="2" 
| rowspan="2" | Co-runners-up
| rowspan="3" |Day 39
|-

! scope="row" style="text-align:left;font-weight:normal" | The Australian Outback
| 50
| White Lake,Michigan
|-
! scope="row" style=text-align:left|'| 41
| Cedar Rapids,Iowa
| 
| 
| Sole Survivor
|}

Future appearances
Malcolm Freberg returned to compete in the following season, Survivor: Caramoan, and later returned again for Survivor: Game Changers. Abi-Maria Gomes returned for Survivor: Cambodia. Denise Stapley returned to compete on Survivor: Winners at War.

Outside of Survivor, Angie Layton later won the title of Miss Utah USA and she competed in Miss USA 2014 on NBC. Gomes competed with two-time Survivor contestant Sierra Dawn Thomas on a Survivor vs Big Brother episode of Fear Factor. Malcolm Freberg was a contestant on the 2022 USA Network reality competition series Snake in the Grass.

Season summary
The fifteen new castaways were split into three tribes and then introduced to their final tribe members, three returning castaways that had been medically evacuated from their previous seasons: Michael Skupin was assigned to Tandang, Jonathan Penner to Kalabaw, and Russell Swan to Matsing. Matsing lost the first four immunity challenges, leaving only Malcolm, who had the tribe's Hidden Immunity Idol, and Denise, his closest ally since the start of the game. After Matsing's dissolution, Malcolm was sent to Tandang and Denise to Kalabaw. Malcolm quickly integrated himself with Tandang's dominant alliance, led by Pete, while Denise joined Kalabaw's majority alliance, led by Jeff Kent. Though Jeff strongly desired to eliminate the returning players, Jonathan had found Kalabaw's immunity idol, using it as leverage to align with Jeff Kent and Carter.

The tribes merged with Tandang holding the majority. Lisa accidentally discovered Malcolm's hidden immunity idol, and promised to keep it a secret if he agreed to take her and Denise to the end of the game. After Jeff Kent and Carter allied with Pete's alliance to vote out the returning players, Jonathan used his idol to save himself. Lisa revealed the existence of Malcolm's idol to the others in an attempt to blindside him. However, after Malcolm convinced the Tandang alliance that he was planning on playing his idol, they voted out Jeff Kent instead. Lisa and Michael, on the bottom of the Tandang alliance, eventually flipped sides, working with the remnants of Kalabaw and Matsing to eliminate the other former Tandang members. Soon after, a core alliance of Michael, Lisa, Malcolm, and Denise was formed, systematically eliminating the others.

Despite winning an advantage in the final Immunity Challenge, Malcolm failed to win immunity and he was subsequently voted out for being the largest threat against the jury. All three finalists were berated by the jury at the Final Tribal Council; Lisa for claiming that she could not handle the pressures of the game, Michael for being strategically and socially inept, and Denise for being condescending at times. However, Denise's argument, coupled with the fact that she was the first player in Survivor history to attend and survive every Tribal Council in the game proved to be the most effective when she earned the title of Sole Survivor by a 6–1–1 vote.In the case of multiple tribes or castaways who win reward or immunity, they are listed in order of finish, or alphabetically where it was a team effort; where one castaway won and invited others, the invitees are in brackets.Episodes

Voting history

ReceptionSurvivor: Philippines was met with positive reception, especially in comparison to the previous four seasons. Dalton Ross of Entertainment Weekly ranked it as the 13th best season, praising the overall cast and particularly the "strong final four." In 2014, Joe Reid of The Wire ranked it as the 11th-best season, and the highest-rated post-Heroes vs. Villains season, praising the characters of Malcolm, Denise, and Lisa in particular. It was ranked as the 10th-best season by Examiner.com, and the 8th-best season by "The Purple Rock Podcast", which summarized: "The Philippines rescued Survivor from a four-season slump by giving us a strong cast," with "an excellent winner" and "some great storytelling (and narration) along the way." In 2013 and 2014, fan site "Survivor Oz" consistently ranked Philippines as the 9th-best season of the series, with its 2013 position also ranking it as the best post-Heroes vs. Villains season, and summarizing: "Considered 'a breath of fresh air' after a run of seasons that disappointed, it gave us...some great characters and amazing gameplay," which "set the bar high for future seasons." In 2015, a poll on former Survivor contestant Rob Cesternino's website saw Philippines rank as the 8th-greatest season of all time, and the second-greatest post-Heroes vs. Villains season, only behind Survivor: Cagayan; Cesternino himself personally ranked it as the 6th-greatest season overall. This was updated in 2021 during Cesternino's podcast, Survivor All-Time Top 40 Rankings, ranking 11th. In 2020, Inside Survivor ranked this season 10th out of 40 saying "Philippines'' isn't just a bright spot in the show's darkest era; it's one of the series' overall best seasons. It delivers a near-perfect balance of strong gameplay, vibrant characters, and some of Survivor's best storytelling in its 20 years on the air."

References

25
2012 American television seasons
2012 in the Philippines
Television shows set in the Philippines
Television shows filmed in the Philippines